Feddersen is a surname. Notable people with the surname include:

Berend Wilhelm Feddersen (1832–1918), German physicist
Ditlevine Feddersen (1727–1803), Norwegian poet and translator
Helga Feddersen (1930–1990), German actress, comedian and writer
Joe Feddersen (born 1953), American artist
Timothy Feddersen (born 1958), American economist and political scientist
Victor Feddersen (born 1968), Danish rower